The Château de Virieu is an historic castle in Virieu, Isère, Rhône-Alpes, France.

History
It was built in the 15th century.

Architectural significance
It has been listed as an official historical monument by the French Ministry of Culture since 1990.

References

Châteaux in Isère
Monuments historiques of Isère